Albibacter helveticus is a  Gram-negative, aerobic, facultatively methanotrophic, non-spore-forming, neutrophilic and mesophilic bacterium species from the genus Albibacter which has been isolated from soil from Switzerland.

References

Further reading

External links
Type strain of Methylopila helvetica at BacDive -  the Bacterial Diversity Metadatabase

Methylocystaceae
Bacteria described in 2000